Amélie Mauresmo defeated Justine Henin-Hardenne in the final, 6–1, 2–0 ret., to win the women's singles tennis title at the 2006 Australian Open. It was her first major title. Henin-Hardenne was suffering from stomach cramps resulting from the accidental misuse of anti-inflammatories for a chronic shoulder injury. This was Mauresmo's third match of the tournament where her opponent retired. Mauresmo and Henin-Hardenne would have a rematch in the  Wimbledon final later that year, where Mauresmo would win in three sets.

Serena Williams was the defending champion, but was defeated in the third round by Daniela Hantuchová.

This tournament saw three-time Australian Open champion Martina Hingis make her first major appearance since the 2002 US Open, after a three-year absence from the tour. It marked the first major main draw appearance for future world No. 1 and two-time Australian Open champion Victoria Azarenka.

Seeds

Qualifying

Draw

Finals

Top half

Section 1

Section 2

Section 3

Section 4

Bottom half

Section 5

Section 6

Section 7

Section 8

Championship match statistics

References

External links
 2006 Australian Open – Women's draws and results at the International Tennis Federation

Women's Singles
Australian Open (tennis) by year – Women's singles
2006 in Australian women's sport